Annabel Linquist, also known as Bel, is an American artist, entrepreneur, musician, and producer.

Annabel specializes in creating custom paintings or "Charms" that "neurologically rewire" the brains of her collectors. According to Linquist, her work is "coded to repel ghosts" and is based on research in epigenetics, neuroplasticity, and the occult. Annabel's privately commissioned "psychic paintings" and custom-made love songs are widely praised and known to be well loved in celebrity circles.

Linquist is the creator of Book Report, a New York Times featured startup that became popular in 2011 by circulating a reincarnated series of Summer Guides that started as an underground Vanity Fair project. She is also known for her work with Sony Ericsson's global promotional campaign for the Xperia Arc, which won a Webby Award in the Integrated Mobile Experience category in London and New York. Linquist created a song using only her mobile phone as a field recording device in Paris for the project.

Bel owns a Parisian record label, Genealogy of Jeremiah, and has released 3 songs with her band, Holy Magic in collaboration with Imogen Heap's Mi.Mu gloves project. Bel plans to release her debut album in 2023.

Annabel's most recent startup, Supercrush Social, is a knowledge commerce company that shows influencers how to build online businesses in the new creator economy. 

Linquist's forthcoming painting project is a crypto-forward NFT experiment called, #charmogram.

References

External links 
http://www.belhq.co
http://www.supercrush.social

Date of birth missing (living people)
Living people
American women painters
21st-century American women artists
Year of birth missing (living people)